David F. Sandberg (born 21 January 1981) is a Swedish filmmaker. He is best known for his collective no-budget horror short films under the online pseudonym ponysmasher and for his 2016 directorial debut Lights Out, based on his 2013 acclaimed horror short of the same name. He also directed the horror film Annabelle: Creation (2017) as part of The Conjuring Universe, and the DC Extended Universe films Shazam! (2019) and Shazam! Fury of the Gods (2023).

Early life
David F. Sandberg was born on 21 January 1981 in Jönköping, Sweden. In the 5th grade, Sandberg says he transferred to Torpa School in Jönköping, where he met his future wife Lotta Losten, and they later both attended Junedal School in the same city. According to Sandberg, he grew up watching films and making his own using his dad's VHS-C camera. He worked in a video store as a teenager, and saved up money to buy his own camcorder for filmmaking.

Sandberg was diagnosed with atypical autism when he was a child, but has said he is unsure if the diagnosis was correct.

Career

Beginning with animation and documentaries (2006–2013) 
In his late teens or early twenties, Sandberg began working at Film i Jönköping, a local film center in Jönköping, initially as an intern. He learned more about filmmaking from Svante Rosberg, the film commissioner who ran Film i Jönköping when he started, and whom Sandberg considers his mentor.

Starting in 2006, Sandberg found moderate online success making animated short films; according to Sandberg, his first online successes were his films För Barnen and Vad Tyst Det Blev, the latter of which garnered 1.7 million views on YouTube. As a result of his increased visibility, he began to receive offers for animation work; his first job was working as a consultant on the TV show  on the Swedish Channel 5.

He continued working at Film i Jönköping, primarily working on documentary projects. From 2006 to 2009, he worked on several documentaries for the Swedish Inheritance Fund. His last collaboration with Rosberg before his retirement was Animera = Göra Livlig, a 2010 documentary about senior citizens creating animated films.

In 2009, he moved to the city of Gothenburg. He continued working on animation and documentaries, and began collaborating with producer Claes Lundin. In 2011, they completed and sold an animated documentary series called Earth Savers, and in 2013, their documentary short Ladyboy premiered at Cinequest Film Festival.

Shifting to feature films (2013–present) 
In 2013, he began to shift his focus away from animation and documentary works and towards horror short films. According to Sandberg, his original goal with filmmaking had been to make horror and sci-fi films, and he felt he needed to have some existing work in that field in order to get funding for future work. Lacking any funding of his own, his shorts were made with no budget—his equipment and props consisted mostly of items he already had or could buy very cheaply, and his only cast and crew were himself and Lotta Losten, his wife. He released his films on both Vimeo and YouTube, using his alias ponysmasher.

In 2013, he released his second horror short, Lights Out, which centered around a monster that only exists when the lights are turned out. The film was a viral success, and quickly garnered millions of views. According to Sandberg, his life changed "in every way imaginable" after Lights Out; he began receiving tons of messages from film industry people who wanted to work with him.

One of these contacts was Lawrence Grey, a producer who wanted to adapt Lights Out into a feature-length film. Grey brought screenwriter Eric Heisserer and producer James Wan on board to collaborate and produce a script with Sandberg, who would also direct the new feature. The film (also titled Lights Out) began production in mid-2015, and premiered at LA Film Festival in June 2016. The film was a massive box office success, grossing $148 million on a $5 million budget, and a moderate critical success, earning a 76% approval score on Rotten Tomatoes and a 58 out of 100 score on Metacritic.

Sandberg next directed Annabelle: Creation, a prequel to supernatural horror film Annabelle and the fourth film in The Conjuring Universe. The film was released in 2017 to positive reviews and box office success.

In 2019, Sandberg directed the DC Extended Universe superhero film Shazam!, based on the DC Comics character of the same name. The film received positive reviews. In April 2019, TheWrap reported that New Line Cinema is developing a sequel with Sandberg returning to direct. He is set to direct and produce the horror film The Culling with his wife Lotta Losten through their production company Mångata. The film will be distributed by Lionsgate. He is set to direct the film adaptation of Cullen Bunn and Jack T. Cole's "The Unsound" graphic novel and thriller film Below, both for Netflix.

Personal life 
Sandberg married actress, designer, and photographer Lotta Losten in 2013. She has featured in many of his short films, including Lights Out. Sandberg and Losten moved to Los Angeles around 2015. 

His younger brother is Joakim Sandberg, creator of the Iconoclasts video game.

Sandberg has been open about his struggles with depression.

Filmography

Films

Shorts

Television

References

External links 

 
 

1981 births
English-language film directors
Horror film directors
Living people
People from Jönköping
Swedish animators
Swedish animated film directors
Swedish documentary film directors
Swedish expatriates in the United States
Swedish film directors
Swedish-language film directors
People on the autism spectrum